The FN FNP pistol is a series of semi-automatic, polymer-framed pistols manufactured in Columbia, South Carolina, by FNH USA, a division of Fabrique Nationale de Herstal. The handgun debuted in early 2006 and is variously chambered for the 9×19mm, .40 S&W, .357 SIG and .45 ACP cartridges.

Standard features
All variations of the pistol include ambidextrous decocking levers and a reversible magazine release, as well as an integrated tactical accessory rail.  In addition, the FNP-45 offers an ambidextrous slide release.

According to FNH USA, the FNP line of pistols is the only polymer-framed autoloading pistol on the market (as of its introduction) with fully replaceable frame rails; this allows the pistol to be rebuilt after extensive firing, thereby extending service life. (Steyr M Series pistols also have this feature, and were released in 1999.)

Design and operation
The pistols of the FNP series are hammer-fired firearms utilizing a Browning cam system with an external extractor. The trigger module is housed inside the polymer frame as an individual unit connected to the hammer. The magazine release button is held in place by a retention pin which can be removed to allow the magazine release button to be reversed. The trigger pull for the FNP-9 variant is generally  while in double action, and  while in single action. While the lower frame is made of high-strength polymer, the slide is made of stainless steel.

Disassembly and reassembly of the handgun is relatively simple. To disassemble the weapon, the slide is locked to the rear and the magazine is released from the weapon. The takedown lever located to the front of the frame is rotated downwards and the slide is released to allow it to slip off the frame rails. Once removed, the recoil spring is removed from its position in the barrel and the barrel is removed. To reassemble the weapon the process is reversed with the slide being slid onto the frame rails and the takedown lever rotated up while the slide is locked to the rear.

Variants
The FNP Series pistol is produced in five basic models with several different variations on each model.  Each of the five models, the FNP-45, the FNP-40, the FNP-357, the FNP-9 and the compact FNP-9M (cancelled), are offered with the following features:

 Double/single action, Double-action only, or Single-action only (cancelled)
 Stainless steel slide (matte black finish) or Stainless steel slide (matte natural finish)
 Black or Dark Earth Frame
 Standard sights or Night sights

The FNP-9 and FNP-40 have also been marketed as the Browning Pro-9 and Pro-40.
The FNP series has been replaced by the FNX pistol series.

Users

Current users
: The Genk police force purchased 190 FNP-9 and FNP-9M pistols in April 2005.
: Spanish Navy Marines have begun to replace old Llama M82s with FNP-9s.
: A quantity of 27 FNP pistols was donated to New Roads, Louisiana Police Department in October 2009 to replace damaged guns, due to budgetary constraints.

Failed bids
 : 19 FNP-9s evaluated as a replacement for the Browning L9A1 pistol, lost to the Glock 17

References

External links
 —FNH USA
 FNP-45 Owner's manual
 FNH Firearms Blog
 Owner review of the FNP9 DA/SA variant

Video
 FNH USA FNP-9 Promotional Video
 FNH USA FNP-40 Promotional Video
 FNH USA FNP-45 Promotional Video

Semi-automatic pistols of the United States
.357 SIG semi-automatic pistols
.40 S&W semi-automatic pistols
.45 ACP semi-automatic pistols
9mm Parabellum semi-automatic pistols
FN Herstal firearms
Police weapons
Weapons and ammunition introduced in 2006